In mathematics, the Heinz mean (named after E. Heinz) of two non-negative real numbers A and B, was defined by Bhatia as:

with 0 ≤ x ≤ .

For different values of x, this Heinz mean interpolates between the arithmetic (x = 0) and geometric (x = 1/2) means such that for 0 < x < :

The Heinz means appear naturally when symmetrizing 
-divergences.

It may also be defined in the same way for positive semidefinite matrices, and satisfies a similar interpolation formula.

See also
Mean
Muirhead's inequality
Inequality of arithmetic and geometric means

References

Means